Pratim D. Gupta is an Indian journalist, film critic, screenwriter and film director. He reviewed films for The Telegraph newspaper and later for online platform Film Companion. His first film as writer-director is Paanch Adhyay, starring Priyanshu Chatterjee and Dia Mirza. His subsequent films Shaheb Bibi Golaam and Maacher Jhol have been big box office hits besides being critically acclaimed.

Early life
Pratim D. Gupta was born in Kolkata in 1981 and studied in South Point School. He has a degree in Mass Communication and Film Studies from St. Xavier's College, Kolkata.

Career
While working as a journalist with The Telegraph, Gupta's script Vanish was selected for the prestigious Binger Script Lab at the Locarno International Film Festival in 2009. He got his first break with the romantic drama Paanch Adhyay which is also the first Bengali film for Bollywood actress Dia Mirza. Written and directed by Gupta, the film was shot almost entirely in Calcutta in November and December 2011. The film was selected as the Centrepiece Premiere at New York's South Asian International Film Festival (SAIFF) and picked as the New Voice in Indian Cinema at the Mumbai Film Festival (MAMI). 

In 2013, Gupta collaborated with 10 other filmmakers to be part of the collaborative project X: Past Is Present. The film premiered in New York in 2014 and released in Indian theatres in November 2015. Gupta's second feature film was, Saheb Bibi Golaam. released in 2016. It was the first mainstream Bangla film to be picked up by Netflix, going on to win 6 Filmfare Awards, including Best Actress, Best Supporting Actor & Best Screenplay for Pratim.

In 2013, Pratim's screenplay Ink was selected for the prestigious Sundance Lab (India edition), where Pratim developed his script with Oscar winners like Asif Kapadia and Joshua Marston. Pratim later adapted the script into his 2019 Bengali film Shantilal O Projapoti Rohoshyo.

Maacher Jhol starring Ritwick Chakraborty as a Paris-based masterchef who returns to his roots in Kolkata was Pratim's third feature film. It was an official selection in the Indian Panorama section of the International Film Festival of India 2018 in Goa. It was later picked up by Netflix as well and this time won Pratim the Best Dialogue Filmfare Award.

Early in 2018, Pratim wrote and directed the Hindi telefilm Mirchi Malini as part of Sujoy Ghosh's Teen Paheliyan series for Star Plus and Hotstar.

Ahare Mon, Pratim's fourth Bengali film starring Adil Hussain and Paoli Dam among others, has played at festivals in India and abroad and was picked as one of the best Indian films of the year by noted film critic Meenakshi Shedde in Sunday Mid Day.

Pratim was featured in the Men of the Year list of 2018 by Man’s World magazine.

Filmography

References

External links

Bengali film directors
Indian film critics
Indian male screenwriters
Film directors from Kolkata
Indian male journalists
Living people
1981 births
University of Calcutta alumni
Bengali people